Bumula Constituency is an electoral constituency in Kenya. It is one of nine constituencies in Bungoma County. The constituency was established for the 1997 elections.

Members of Parliament 
 Hon. JACK WANAMI WAMBOKA

Wards

References

Constituencies in Bungoma County
Constituencies of Western Province (Kenya)
1997 establishments in Kenya
Constituencies established in 1997